Barøya is an uninhabited island in Narvik Municipality in Nordland county, Norway. The  island is located in the Ofotfjorden near the entrance to the Efjorden. Barøy Lighthouse is located on the northwestern part of the island.

See also
List of islands of Norway

References

Ballangen
Islands of Nordland
Uninhabited islands of Norway